Doris Louise Wethers (December 14, 1927 – January 28, 2019) was an American pediatrician known for her research on sickle-cell disease.

Wethers was born in Passaic, New Jersey on December 14, 1927, to William and Lillian (née Wilkinson) Wethers. She graduated magna cum laude from Queens College in 1948, majoring in chemistry, and earned her M.D. at Yale University School of Medicine in 1952 (becoming the third black woman to do so), after which Wethers spent ten years as a pediatrician in private practice. Her office was located next to the office of her father, physician William Wethers.

Wethers became the first black attending physician at St. Luke's–Roosevelt Hospital Center in 1958. She served as medical director for Speedwell Services for Children from 1961 to 1973, and as director of pediatrics and opening sickle-cell anemia programs at Knickerbocker Hospital (1965–1973), Sydenham Hospital (1969–1974), and St. Luke's Hospital (1974–1979). She received a grant for research on sickle-cell disease in 1979.

She conducted research at St. Luke's–Roosevelt Hospital Center and conducted in-patient rounds for medical students learning about sickle-cell disease. Wethers served as director of the hospital's sickle cell program until retiring in 1999.

Wethers also co-founded the Foundation for Research and Education in Sickle Cell Disease with Drs. Yvette Fay Francis-McBarnette and Lila A. Fenwick.

In 1987, Wethers acted as the chairwoman of a panel on sickle-cell screening commissioned by the National Institutes of Health. The panel recommended that all newborn babies, regardless of ethnicity, be tested routinely for sickle-cell anemia; by 2006 this practice had been implemented in all fifty states.

Wethers died after a stroke on January 28, 2019, in Yonkers, New York, aged 91.

Works

See also 
Sickle cell disease
Angella D. Ferguson

References 

1927 births
American pediatricians
Women pediatricians
African-American physicians
American women physicians
2019 deaths
Place of birth missing
Yale School of Medicine alumni
Queens College, City University of New York alumni
20th-century African-American people
21st-century African-American people
20th-century African-American women
21st-century African-American women